Felton is an unincorporated community in Haralson County, Georgia, United States. Felton has a post office with ZIP code 30140.

References

Unincorporated communities in Haralson County, Georgia
Unincorporated communities in Georgia (U.S. state)